The Heidi Chronicles is a 1995 made-for-television drama film by Wendy Wasserstein adapted from her play of the same name. The film premiered on TNT on October 15, 1995.

Plot summary
The plot follows Heidi Holland from high school in the 1960s to her career as a successful art historian over 20 years later. The play's main themes deal with the changing role of women during this time period, describing both Heidi's ardent feminism during the 1970s and her eventual sense of betrayal during the 1980s.

Cast 
 Jamie Lee Curtis - Heidi Holland
 Tom Hulce -  Peter Patrone
 Peter Friedman - Scoop Rosenbaum
 Kim Cattrall - Susan
 Eve Gordon -  Lisa
 Julie White -  Fran
 Shari Belafonte - April Lambert

Awards and nominations
Awards
 1996 Emmy Award for Outstanding Supporting Actor - Miniseries or Movie – Tom Hulce
 1996 CableACE Award for Best Supporting Actor - Miniseries or Movie – Tom Hulce

Nominations
 1996 Emmy Award for Outstanding Made for Television Movie
 1996 Golden Globe Award for Best Mini-Series Or Motion Picture Made for Television
 1996 Golden Globe Award for Best Supporting Actor – Series, Miniseries or Television Film – Tom Hulce
 1996 Golden Globe Award for Best Actress – Miniseries or Television Film – Jamie Lee Curtis

External links 
 
 
 
 

1995 films
1995 television films
1995 drama films
American drama films
American films based on plays
Films set in the 1960s
Films set in the 1970s
Films set in the 1980s
Films directed by Paul Bogart
Films scored by David Shire
TNT Network original films
1990s American films